Rikke Marie Madsen (born 9 August 1997) is a Danish professional footballer who plays as a forward for American NWSL club North Carolina Courage and the Denmark national team.

Club career
Madsen joined North Carolina Courage in the National Women's Soccer League in August 2022, with a contract lasting until the end of the 2023 season.

International goals

References

External links
 

1997 births
Living people
Danish women's footballers
Denmark women's international footballers
Women's association football forwards
VSK Aarhus (women) players
Vålerenga Fotball Damer players
Madrid CFF players
North Carolina Courage players
Melbourne Victory FC (A-League Women) players
Elitedivisionen players
Toppserien players
Primera División (women) players
National Women's Soccer League players
UEFA Women's Euro 2022 players
Danish expatriate women's footballers
Danish expatriate sportspeople in Norway
Expatriate women's footballers in Norway
Danish expatriate sportspeople in Spain
Expatriate women's footballers in Spain
Danish expatriate sportspeople in the United States
Expatriate women's soccer players in the United States